Bigazzi is an Italian surname. Notable people with the surname include:

 Beppe Bigazzi (1933–2019), Italian executive, journalist, television presenter and writer
 Giancarlo Bigazzi (1940–2012), Italian composer and author
 Luca Bigazzi (born 1958), Italian cinematographer
 Mirko Bigazzi (born 1989), Italian professional footballer

Italian-language surnames